Metapterygota is a clade of winged insects containing order Odonata and Infraclass Neoptera. They share morphological characteristics of a loss of caudal filaments and a subimago stage. Genetically the clade is supported by similarities in the mitochondrial genomes.

Living Subgroups
Odonatoptera
Odonata
Neoptera
Endopterygota (=Metabola or Holometabola)
Exopterygota

Phylogeny

References

 
Insect taxonomy
Pterygota